Peter Atkinson (born 14 December 1949) was an English List A cricketer. He was a left-handed batsman who played for Northumberland. He was born in Gainsborough.

Atkinson represented Worcestershire Second XI in the Second XI Championship between 1966 and 1968. Having taken a year out of the game, he played his first Minor Counties Championship game for Northumberland in 1970.

Atkinson made his only List A appearance for the team in the 1971 Gillette Cup, against Lincolnshire. Opening the batting for Northumberland, Atkinson failed to score.

External links
Peter Atkinson at Cricket Archive

1949 births
Living people
English cricketers
Northumberland cricketers
People from Gainsborough, Lincolnshire